Ernest Hiram Brülhart (1878 in Fribourg – 1949 in Fribourg), was a Swiss painter and illustrator .

Biography 
Born in Fribourg in 1873, Ernest Hiram Brülhart first became an engineer before he followed Ferdinand Hodler's classes at the Musée industriel in Fribourg encouraged by the painter Joseph Reichlen. He then went to Paris where he attended first the Académie Julian circa 1900, and then the Académie de la Grande Chaumière. A very frequent traveller, he stayed in Saint-Tropez, visited Bucharest where he was invited by his friend and mecene the ambassador René de Weck, then in Venice, before he finally came back to Fribourg. He was then a teacher at the Ecole des arts et métiers, where he had Gaston Thévoz as a student.

Works in public institutions 
 Portrait du Ministre René de Weck, vers 1934. Musée d’Art et d’Histoire, Fribourg 
 Romont de l'ouest, 1930–1949. Musée d’Art et d’Histoire, Fribourg

References
 Hodler und Freiburg. Die Mission des Künstlers. Hodler et Fribourg. La Mission de l'artiste, Ausstellung-Katalog, Musée d'Art et d'Histoire, Fribourg, 1981
 La tête des nôtres : portraits à Fribourg, 1850-2000, exhibition catalogue, Musée d'Art et d'Histoire de Fribourg, Fribourg, 2004 
 Un carrefour artistique, Philippe Clerc, in: La Gruyère dans le miroir de son patrimoine, Une région en représentation, t.5, Editions Alphil, 2011, p. 14
 SCHUSTER CORDONE, Caroline, Hiram Brülhart, in: Fribourg 1700, no.281, janvier 2012, p. 13

External links 
 

1870s births
1947 deaths
Modern painters
20th-century Swiss painters
Swiss male painters
People from Fribourg
20th-century Swiss male artists